Cape Melville, is a low-lying, ice-free headland at the eastern end of King George Island in the South Shetland Islands of Antarctica.  Some 388 ha of the site has been identified as an Important Bird Area (IBA) by BirdLife International because it supports a large breeding colony of about 16,000 pairs of chinstrap penguins.

0.5 nautical miles (1 km) south of Cape Melville is a rock named Livonia Rock.

References

Important Bird Areas of Antarctica
Penguin colonies
Melville